Melbourne Burning is a 1946-1947 painting by Australian artist Arthur Boyd. It has been described as "his apocalyptic image of Melbourne burning, like a Biblical narrative in the context of the second world war". The painting has been reported to have displayed in the Perth office of Robert Holmes à Court. It was purchased by David Walsh for AUD 3.2 million. It is "one of Walsh's favourite works". The painting is the collection of the Museum of Old and New Art.

References

Australian paintings